Left Socialists was a political party in Denmark. The party worked on what it called an "undogmatic revolutionary and Marxist basis". It was formed in 1967 as a split from the Socialist People's Party (SF).

In 1989 the Left Socialists founded the Red-Green Alliance with the Communist Party of Denmark and Socialist Workers Party to contest in elections. At its congress in 1998 the Left Socialists transformed itself from a party to an association. Since then, VS concentrated most of its work towards building of the Red-Green Alliance. It continued to publish Solidaritet (Solidarity) and maintained a website, but except for that it had little activity of its own. Solidarity later became an independent publisher.

On 8 September 2013, the Left Socialists disbanded, explaining they did not want to be a "party within the party".

Election results

Notes

References

External links
VS website

1967 establishments in Denmark
Defunct socialist parties in Denmark
Political parties established in 1967